Karpoš Municipality is one of the ten municipalities that make up the city of Skopje, the capital of the Republic of North Macedonia.

Geography
Karpoš borders
 Saraj Municipality and Ǵorče Petrov Municipality to the west,
 Čučer-Sandevo Municipality to the north,
 Butel Municipality to the northeast,
 Čair Municipality, Centar Municipality and Kisela Voda Municipality to the east, and
 Sopište Municipality to the south.

Demographics

According to the last national census from 2002, the municipality has 59,810 inhabitants.

est. from 31.12.2012 60.520

Ethnic groups in the municipality include:
Macedonians = 52,943 (88.52%)
Serbs = 2,195 (3.67%)
Albanians = 1,952 (3.26%)
Romani = 615 (1.03%)
others.

Twin towns
Karpoš Municipality is twinned with following town:
 Novi Beograd, Serbia
 Sremski Karlovci, Serbia
 Lapithos, Northern Cyprus

Twin municipalities 

 Triaditsa, Sofia

References

External links
 Official website

 
Municipalities of North Macedonia
Municipalities of Skopje